Targeting Iran is a 2013 documentary film "designed to help Western audiences understand the complexities of historic and contemporary U.S./Iranian relations in an effort to derail potential military action." Based on the 2007 book of the same name by David Barsamian, the film "seeks to elucidate the myths and popular misconceptions surrounding Iran's nuclear aspirations."

Production
Portland filmmaker Andy Norris approached Barsamian about making a film based on the book after seeing him give a reading at the Pine Grove Community House in Manzanita, Oregon in October 2007.  Visual footage of contemporary Iran was provided by travel writer Rick Steves.

Interviewees
 MIT's Jim Walsh
 Trita Parsi
 Noam Chomsky
 Dr. Vandana Shiva
 Stephen Kinzer
 David Barsamian 
 Nahid Mozaffari
 Nazila Fathi

Reception
Targeting Iran was included in the lineup of the 2013/2014 season of the Noor Iranian Film Festival.

Critical
Willamette Week gave the film a "Critic's Score" of 'C', saying "Targeting Iran is a classic case of TMI: Norris tries to pack a 272-page book into 71 minutes of film, and the resulting documentary starts to burst at the seams."

See also
 Views on the nuclear program of Iran

References

External links
 
 Targeting Iran promotional video on YouTube

2013 films
American documentary films
2013 documentary films
Documentary films about nuclear war and weapons
Documentary films about historical events
Documentary films about Iran
Documentary films about American politics
2010s English-language films
2010s American films